The ruddy foliage-gleaner (Clibanornis rubiginosus) is a species of bird in the family Furnariidae. Its range is highly disjunct, with populations in the highlands of Mexico and Central America, and lowlands and foothills in the Chocó, eastern Andes, and western and northeastern Amazon Basin. It is found in forest. There are distinct vocal variations throughout its range, suggesting that more than one species is involved, and one such population has recently been split from the ruddy foliage-gleaner as the Santa Marta foliage-gleaner. The ruddy foliage-gleaner has recently been reclassified into the genus Clibanornis.

References

ruddy foliage-gleaner
Birds of Central America
Birds of Colombia
Birds of Venezuela
Birds of Ecuador
Birds of Peru
Birds of the Guianas
ruddy foliage-gleaner
ruddy foliage-gleaner
Taxonomy articles created by Polbot
Birds of Mexico
Birds of the Sierra Madre del Sur